Cadbury World is a visitor attraction in Bournville, Birmingham, England, featuring a self-guided exhibition tour, created and run by the Cadbury Company. The tour tells the history of chocolate, and of the Cadbury business.

A second location in Dunedin, New Zealand, closed in May 2018.

Birmingham

Overview 
Cadbury World was opened on 14 August 1990 by Morgan Anderson on Cadbury's Bournville manufacturing site, and has expanded and developed its content through 'continuous improvement'. It was formally opened by then Prime Minister John Major on 12 April 1991.

Cadbury World has gone on to become one of Birmingham's largest leisure attractions. Over 500,000 people visit there each year especially children and students. The estate features a respected education programme (linking back directly to the educational advancements and interests of the company's original founders). Cadbury World provides a Chocolate afternoon tea.

Whilst not a factory tour, Cadbury World offers its visitors the opportunity to explore and discover chocolate's history, and to learn about the origins and story of the Cadbury business, which is now part of Mondelez, the world's second largest confectionery manufacturer.

In 2022, it was announced that Merlin Entertainments were to take over the running of the attraction, subject to the approval of the Competition and Markets Authority.

Fourteen Zones 

Cadbury World currently features 14 zones which tell the story of chocolate and the Cadbury business through various static sets, animatronics, video presentations, multi-sensory cinema, interactive displays and activities, and staff demonstrations.

In August 2019, Heritage Interactive installed seven interactive panels in the Aztec Jungle.

These zones also include "The Bournville Experience" (Opened in 2007 replacing the Cadbury Collection Museum), which explains the background to the development of the site on which it is located and "4D Chocolate Adventure", constructed in 2014 and replacing "Essence" which in turn replaced "Cadburyland" before it, and which incorporates a 3D cinema.

Dunedin

In July 2003 another Cadbury World was opened in Dunedin, New Zealand, located in the Cadbury Factory site at 280 Cumberland St, close to the city centre near the Octagon. Unlike the Cadbury World in Birmingham, it offered guided tours around the manufacturing area of the factory.

In 2018, the factory closed. Despite plans to keep it open, Cadbury World was also closed that year, to make way for a new NZ$1.4 billion hospital to replace the existing Dunedin Hospital. Mondelez vice-president Banfield confirmed that the former Cadbury site had been sold to the Ministry of Heath for an undisclosed amount. It was reported that the closure of Cadbury World would lead to the loss of 39 jobs. During the demolition, business records from Hudson & Co from 1899 to 1988 were discovered in a cupboard. Hudson & Co amalgamated with Cadbury Fry in 1929.

See also
 Cadbury
 Cadbury Ireland
 Cadbury's Claremont
 History of Cadbury
 Cadbury chocolate factory, Toronto

References

External links
 

Cadbury
Museums in Birmingham, West Midlands
Museums in Dunedin
Chocolate museums
Food museums in the United Kingdom
Animatronic attractions
Chocolate factories